Adrian A. Boafo (born May 10, 1994) is an American politician. He is a member of the Maryland House of Delegates for District 23 in Prince George's County, Maryland. He previously served as the mayor pro tempore of Bowie, Maryland, and as a member of the Bowie City Council from 2019 to 2023.

Background 
Boafo graduated from DeMatha Catholic High School in 2012. He later attended the University of Baltimore, where he received a Bachelor of Arts degree in government and public policy in 2016, and American University, where he received a Master of Business Administration degree in 2019. After graduating, Boafo worked as a national press assistant for U.S. Representative Ruben Kihuen from 2017 to 2018. He later served as the campaign manager for House Majority leader Steny Hoyer from 2019 to 2021.

Bowie mayor pro-tempore 
Boafo filed to run for District 3 of the Bowie city council on May 8, 2019, challenging incumbent councilmember Darian Senn-Carter. Boafo won election to the Bowie city council on November 6, 2019, with 34.8 percent of the vote. Soon after, the council selected him to serve as the city's mayor pro tempore, succeeding at-large councilmember Henri Gardner. While working for the Bowie city council, Boafo also worked as a federal lobbyist for the Oracle Corporation.

Boafo announced he would run for the Maryland House of Delegates in District 23 on February 25, 2022. His campaign was endorsed by House Majority Leader Steny Hoyer.  Boafo won the Democratic primary on July 19, 2022, placing second with 14.4 percent of the vote.

In the legislature 
Boafo was sworn into the Maryland House of Delegates on January 11, 2023. He is a member of the House Economic Matters Committee.

Political positions

Development initiatives
In May 2020, Boafo voted to stop construction and cancel the city's contract to build a new ice rink, instead opting to build an indoor courts facility. In July 2020, Boafo voted against cancel public-private partnership proposals to repair and operate Bowie's city-operated ice rink. After the city council voted to reject the proposals, it created a task force for the amenity. The task force unveiled its recommendations on January 19, 2021.

In January 2021, Boafo voted against a bill to support a preliminary plan for the Bowie's Mill Branch Crossing development.

In June 2021, Boafo introduced a bill to provide city residents with a rebate of up to $50 to install a new water filtration system. The City Council unanimously voted to pass the initiative. Later that month, the United States House Committee on Appropriations' Interior, Environment, and Related Agencies Subcommittee approved a $2 million request from the city to replace one mile of a tuberculated cast iron water main.

Social issues
In 2019, Boafo included a budget line item in the city's budget to reimburse Bowie residents for installing outdoor cameras. In November 2020, Boafo and the Bowie Police Department launched a program to provide rebates up to $50 for residents who purchase and install a home security camera.

In June 2020, Boafo attended a vigil to honor George Floyd, Ahmaud Arbery, and Breonna Taylor at Allen Pond Park in Bowie.

Statewide politics
In 2022, Boafo issued a statement asking for a correction from Bowie mayor Tim Adams after he included Boafo on his list of endorsements in the 2022 Maryland Comptroller election, saying that despite having a "great working relationship with Mayor Adams, there was no communication or confirmation in advance of the endorsement." Boafo later endorsed state delegate Brooke Lierman for Comptroller of Maryland. He also endorsed author and former nonprofit CEO Wes Moore for Governor of Maryland.

Electoral history

References

External links
 

1994 births
21st-century African-American politicians
21st-century American politicians
African-American state legislators in Maryland
American University alumni
Democratic Party members of the Maryland House of Delegates
Living people
People from Bowie, Maryland
University of Baltimore alumni
Maryland city council members
African-American city council members in Maryland